Opharus bipunctatus is a moth of the family Erebidae. It was described by Vincent and Laguerre in 2009. It is found in the Dominican Republic.

References

Opharus
Moths described in 2009
Moths of the Caribbean